The Meilahti Tower Hospital, part of the Helsinki University Central Hospital (HUCH), is the largest hospital in Finland, located in the Meilahti district of Helsinki.

The hospital has a helipad with the ICAO airport code EFHY.

External links 
 
 Meilahti Tower Hospital

Hospital buildings completed in 1965
Hospitals in Helsinki
Hospitals established in 1965
Meilahti